Vespertiliibacter is a genus of bacteria from the class of Pasteurellaceae with one known species (Vespertiliibacter pulmonis). Vespertiliibacter pulmonis has been isolated from the lung of a bat (Nyctalus noctula) from Berlin in Germany.

References

Pasteurellales
Bacteria genera
Monotypic bacteria genera